Mus of Kerbridge is a 1995 fantasy novel by Paul Kidd. It follows the story of a mouse called Mus who, after being changed into an intelligent humanoid version of his species able to talk, has been sent to spy on the princess of Kerbridge only to help her fight against the warlady of the South. It is set in the same world detailed in the Lace & Steel RPG.

Background
Mus of Kerbridge was first published in the United States in May 1995 by TSR, Inc. in paperback format. In 2007 it was republished at Lulu. It was a short-list nominee for the 1995 Aurealis Award for best fantasy novel but lost to Garth Nix's Sabriel.

References

External links

1995 novels
1995 fantasy novels
Australian fantasy novels
Novels about animals
Fictional mice and rats